Canoas Creek is a tributary creek to the Guadalupe River. 
Canoas creek's was a originally a series of ponds and wetlands named "Arroyo de las Tulares de las Canoas" after the numerous tule plants in these marshes that were used to build canoes. In 1889 the city of San Jose used Santa Clara County prison labor to build a 2,000 foot hand dug channel to formerly connect Canoas Creek at Almaden Road to the Guadalupe Creek in order to drain the marsh.

Canoas creek is prone to flash floods that have caused the Guadalupe Creek to flood downtown San Jose several times. Over time the creek has been dug deeper and in the 1970s much of the creek was turned into concrete channels.

Fish caught in this creek include: Bass, Carp, Catfish and Trout.
 Valley water manages the upkeep of the concrete channels as well as reducing the vegetation along the creek using a large herd of goats.

References

External links
 Canoas Creek Inhabitants - YouTube video
 Canoas Creek at Branham Lane near flooding, 2009 - YouTube video

Rivers of Santa Clara County, California
Tributaries of Guadalupe River (California)